Branton Manor is a historic home located at Sykesville, Carroll County, Maryland, United States. It is two stories with a gable roof and a large stone interior chimney at the east end. The overall exterior appearance of the house is quite mixed, with each section having a different style and roofline. The oldest section dates to approximately 1766.

Branton Manor was listed on the National Register of Historic Places in 1978.

References

External links

, including photo in 2006, at Maryland Historical Trust

Houses on the National Register of Historic Places in Maryland
Houses in Carroll County, Maryland
Houses completed in the 18th century
Sykesville, Maryland
National Register of Historic Places in Carroll County, Maryland